Rockin' Jump Trampoline Parks (or simply Rockin' Jump) is a chain of trampoline parks operated in the United States of America and owned by CircusTrix or by franchisees.

History
 
The chain was launched by Drew Wilson and Marc Collopy in 2010 with the opening of a trampoline park in Dublin, California. The California park was announced in 2011 and opened a second facility in 2012. 

 
In 2017, CircusTrix acquired SkyZone theme parks. In 2018, it acquired  Rockin' Jump trampoline parks.

Parks
In 2021, Rockin' Jump had 41 locations located throughout the United States.

References

External links
 Official Website

Trampolining
Franchises
American companies established in 2010
2010 establishments in California